Devonport City Strikers Football Club, or the "Strikers" is a soccer club based in Devonport, Tasmania. It competes in the  National Premier Leagues, the second-tier of Australian football.

The club currently plays at the 3500 capacity, Valley Road Ground, and have recorded 3000+ fans in their FFA Cup games. The club fields teams in all junior divisions, as well as women's sides. Devonport City was formed in 1952 as an amalgamation of Devonport and Devonport Rovers, and has since won the state title eight times, most recently in 2020.

History

1950s
1950– Soccer starts on the North West Coast. A meeting was held in the Bay View Hotel in Burnie to form an association. As a result of the meeting four teams were formed. APPM, Burnie Celtic, Penguin and The Advocate. The Advocate team folded soon after due to a lack of players.

1952– Devonport united plays in the NWTSA. Little is known or recorded about the history of soccer in Devonport but a team formed by Norman Holmes played in the North-West league in 1952. Norman Holmes is a life member of the Devonport City Soccer Club. Games were played at St George's oval. A team from Railton also played in the Coastal roster. Teams were APPM, Burnie Celtic, Penguin, Devonport and Railton.

1954– It is not known why but Devonport and Railton did not participate in the 1954 Roster

1960s
1961– It was not until 1961 that Devonport United was officially established at the well attended meeting on Wednesday 3 May. The club affiliated with the NWTSA and joined the roster on 3 June. Devonport United made an impressive debut when held by the strong Ulverstone side to a 2–1 loss. The Ulverstone Club was also formed in 1961 and played from the start of the season. Members of the original Railton Club donated their blue and gold boxed square strip to the newly formed Devonport Club. Home games were played at the Devonport Showgrounds and at the Spreyton Racecourse.

1965– Devonport United moved to Byard Park and shared the ground with the newly formed Mersey Soccer Club. The old wooden shed that was used as change rooms had no toilet facilities, no electricity and no showers. Monthly meetings were held with the use of lanterns. In 1965 the clubs requested Devonport Council to have Byard Park fenced as the clubs desperately needed an enclosed ground. The council replied that Byard Park, when purchased from the Byard family had to remain open parkland and the development of a Soccer Centre at Coles Beach road would be to the advantage of both clubs interests.

1966– August. Devonport United and Mersey ask the council for a date for the start of development at Coles Beach. In November, Mersey and Devonport amalgamated at a special meeting held at the Adult Education Centre. The main objective was to continue discussions with council for a ground for the exclusive use of soccer.

1967– August. Council advise that the Coles Beach plan has to be abandoned because the area was insufficient in size for the full development. As an alternative council have plans for a soccer centre to be located on the newly acquired Baptist Church property in the Valley Road area. Pending completion of these plans the possibility of the club using Girdlestone Oval on alternative Saturdays to the East Devonport Football Club was pro-posed.

1968– October. Council writes and asks what financial assistance the club is prepared to make towards the establishment of Valley Road. The club offers $600 per year.

1969– 14 April. In a lengthy letter from the club's Secretary, Ernie Armsby writes-
“Negotiations have been proceeding with council for several year and members are losing heart that a soccer centre would not eventuate and suggest making St. Georges Oval their permanent home. The club will accept responsibility for erecting the fence.”
On 18 April the council writes that Spreyton Racecourse Committee agree to using the ground. On 1 May the council writes that St George Oval be set aside as future headquarters. On 13 June, the council advises that they have received an objection from a resident in East Devonport to a fence and the council offers the use of Don Cricket Clubs grounds. The Cricket Club agrees. On 23 October, Council Executive and Soccer Club representatives meet to discuss developments. On 28 October, we have pleasure in advising that the council authorises the immediate development on a Soccer Centre in the Valley Road area.

1970s
1970– 13 March the council considers tenders for the construction of change rooms at Valley Road for the sum of $16,561. Wilkins, Grey and Dowling are contracted to complete construction by 29 May. In August, the Club asks the council to start work on the playing area.

1971– 18 July. Devonport Soccer Club uses Valley Road for the first time. The club experiences difficulties because of the approach path from Valley Road. (At this time Lovett St did not exist.)

1972– March. The soccer club seeks council permission to erect lights for training. Cost $3,000

1972– 3 June Valley Road Soccer Centre is officially opened by Councillor Percy Williams, Warden of Devonport. Devonport beats Hobart Metro 3–2 in an Ampol Cup Game on the opening day and soccer in Devonport came of age.
Later in 1972, Lovett Street was constructed and the Valley Road Soccer Centre was open to traffic.

1973– September. Soccer Club runs Night Soccer Series sponsored by Norco Batteries and The Advocate Newspaper.

1975 – Australian Federal Government announces "Red Scheme", an initiative where sporting clubs could apply for building projects. The Soccer Club applies and is granted $13,795 for clubroom extensions. The club erects a grand stand which costs $12,000. They also upgrade floodlights on the main ground and erect lights on the training ground. The cost of which is $20,000 from club funds.

1976– 16 May. Bingo starts and becomes so popular that the club obtains a loan from the council for $40,000 for extensions. Plans included an office and a large lounge area. Further extensions were necessary and a loan of $30,000 was obtained from the ANZ Bank.
During the 1980s Devonport City welcomed overseas coaches. In 1980, Steve Darby from Liverpool. In 1982, Bob Oates from Scunthorpe and in 1985, Phil Ashworth from Rochdale.

1980s
1987– The Club hosts the National Under 14 Carnival from 26 September to 4 October. Many visitors comment that this was one of the best carnivals they had ever taken part in. It was an exceptional and memorable event. Socceroos goalkeeper, Mark Schwarzer played for NSW in the tournament.

1987– 13 October at 1:30 am FIRE DESTROYS CLUBROOMS. Sadly, eight days after the carnival ended, the Devonport City Soccer clubrooms were burnt to the ground. Total Damage in excess of $350,000.

1987– 17 October. The Club meets the Council's Executive to apply for a Tasmanian Government Grant. A$220,000 grant was approved and along with $275,000 insurance on the destroyed clubrooms plans were drawn up for a new clubroom with a total cost of $475,000. Work started on 4 March 1988 and were completed on 30 August. The club was officially opened by the Hon. Tony Rundle, MHA on 10 September. The club rooms and contents were valued at $650,000.

1989– George Best, rated as one of the world's best soccer players visits Devonport. About 1000 soccer fans from throughout Tasmania converged on Valley Road to see George Best in action. George Best, former Manchester United and Northern Island player came out for Devonport City against a strong Tasmanian side. The match ended in a 2–2 draw.

2010s
In July 2012, the club was granted admission into the new 8-team statewide league called the Victory League. The competition which started in 2013 would soon become the National Premier Leagues Tasmania in 2016 with the club taking home their first title after they defeated the Northern Rangers FC in the second to last round of the season. The team also qualified for the FFA Cup proper (round of 32) for the first time by beating South Hobart 1–0 in the final of the Lakoseljac Cup. They would take on the Lambton Jaffas at home and they won by a score of 1–0 to become the first Tasmanian team to reach the next round of the cup. In the Round of 16, they took on Bentleigh Greens SC at home & were defeated 0–1, with the winning goal coming in the first period of extra-time. That season would see Devonport take out the NPL Tasmania title for the first time which meant that they qualified through to the finals. In the first round of the Finals, they would lose 6–1 to Perth SC in the opening round.

After seeing the team finishing in third place in 2017, the team with Chris Gallo (who was re-signed for another year), won the double by taking out the Lakoseljac Cup over South Hobart 1–0. They would take out the league title after defeating Kingborough on the final day of the season to secure a spot in the NPL finals where they would lose to Heidelberg United in the first round. Devonport lost 3-2 with the last kick of the game. 

2019 saw the resignation of head coach Chris Gallo and the appointment of new head coach Rick Coghlan. With the loss of several important players the Strikers calibre was questioned as the year began. The Strikers made the Lakoseljac Cup final before heartbreak saw them lose to South Hobart FC. but this did not deter them in the league as they went on to win with two games to spare. The victory saw the Strikers qualify for the National Premier League finals competition, where they would lose to Northern New South Wales representative, Maitland FC 3–2.

Seasons - Men

Honours
Milan Lakoseljac Cup: 4 times (1977, 2002, 2016, 2018)
State Championships: 8 times (1994, 1998, 2003, 2004, 2016, 2018, 2019, 2020)
State Championships Runners-up: 2 times as Devonport (1974, 1977), 7 times as Devonport City (1982, 1983, 1992, 1993, 1997, 2002, 2008)
Northern Premierships:  7 times (2000, 2002, 2003, 2004, 2008, 2016, 2020) 4 times as Devonport Rovers (1985,1987,1988,1989) 2 times as Devonport (1974,1977)

References

External links
 Devonport Strikers – official website

Association football clubs established in 1982
National Premier Leagues clubs
Soccer clubs in Tasmania
Sport in Devonport, Tasmania
1982 establishments in Australia